Trinity Evangelical Lutheran Church of Manhattan is a Lutheran church located at 164 West 100th Street just east of Amsterdam Avenue, on the Upper West Side of Manhattan in New York City. It was founded in 1888 as the German Evangelical Lutheran Church to serve German immigrants moving into the Upper West Side.  It initially held services in a storefront until money had been raised to buy land and build a sanctuary.

The double-height brick and stone masonry church building was constructed in 1908, and was designed by George W. Conable in the Gothic Revival style. In the 1950s, the building was slated for demolition as part of Robert Moses' urban renewal program, but the parish resisted and eventually, after 10 years, won the battle.  It became the only structure within  in its neighborhood not to have been razed by Moses. On September 26, 2009, the building was listed on the National Register of Historic Places.

References

External links 

 

German-American culture in New York City
Properties of religious function on the National Register of Historic Places in Manhattan
Lutheran churches in New York City
Upper West Side
Churches in Manhattan
Churches completed in 1908
Gothic Revival church buildings in New York City
Churches on the National Register of Historic Places in New York (state)
1888 establishments in New York (state)